The following is a list of events in 1977 in Nigeria.

Incumbents
 Head of State: Olusegun Obasanjo
 Deputy Head of State: Shehu Musa Yar'Adua
 Commissioner of Defence: Olusegun Obasanjo
 Chief of Army Staff: Theophilus Yakubu Danjuma
 Chief Justice: Darnley Arthur Alexander

Events
 15 January–12 February – FESTAC 77 held in Lagos.
 18 February – Kalakuta Republic, a communal compound founded by political activist Fela Kuti is destroyed by armed soldiers.
 August – West African Games held in Lagos.
 Nigerian Academy of Science is established.

Births
 16 October – Lucy Ejike, Paralympic powerlifter
 15 September – Chimamanda Ngozi Adichie, author

References

 
1970s in Nigeria
Years of the 19th century in Nigeria
Nigeria
Nigeria